Eliza Rose is an English DJ, music producer and singer.

Born in the East End of London, Rose grew up in Dalston and began working at the Flashback record shop when she was 15 years old.  A fan of soul and jazz music, she sang from her youth, and began DJing in her late teens, once she had enough money to buy records, seeing it as a way to acquire more music.  She attended college and university, and also took courses in music production.  She presents a radio show for The Vinyl Factory, and recorded collaborations with a variety of other artists.

Interplanetary Criminal, a DJ and producer, sent Rose the song "B.O.T.A. (Baddest of Them All)", and she wrote lyrics for it, inspired by Pam Grier in the film Coffy.  The song proved a surprise success, played heavily on the London club scene and then at the Glastonbury Festival 2022.  It entered the UK charts in August 2022, and in September reached number one.  She became the first female DJ to top the UK Singles Chart since Sonique in 2000. In December 2022 it was certified platinum by the British Phonographic Industry (BPI).

Rose has also written a novel, What Happens in Dreamland.

Discography

Extended plays

Singles

Awards and nominations

References

Year of birth missing (living people)
Living people
People from Dalston
21st-century English women singers
21st-century English singers
English women DJs
Musicians from London